Warflying  or warstorming is an activity consisting of using an airplane and a Wi-Fi-equipped computer, such as a laptop or a PDA, to detect Wi-Fi wireless networks. Warstorming shares similarities to Wardriving and Warwalking in all aspects except for the method of transport.

It originated in Western Australia with the WaFreeNet group taking up a Grumman Tiger four-seater near Perth in August 2002. It has also been done over Silicon Valley.

Due to the nature of flying, it is much more difficult to attempt to access open networks while warflying.

References

External links
An advanced warflying project 

Computer network security
Wireless networking